Shushama Das (born 1 May 1930) is a Bangladeshi folk singer. She was awarded Ekushey Padak by the Government of Bangladesh in 2017.

Career
Das was born to Rashiklal Das and Dibyamoyi Das. She was married to Prannath Das in 1946. Her younger brother Ramkanai Das was also an Ekushey Padak-winning musician.

References

Living people
1930 births
People from Sullah Upazila
Recipients of the Ekushey Padak
Bangladeshi folk singers
20th-century Bangladeshi women singers
20th-century Bangladeshi singers
Bangladeshi Hindus